San Fulgencio is a village in the province of Alicante and autonomous community of Valencia, Spain. English was the most spoken language in the town

References

Populated places in the Province of Alicante